Wiffle ball, a team sport developed in 1953 in Fairfield, Connecticut, is a scaled back variation of baseball designed for playing in a confined space. The sport is played using a perforated light-weight plastic ball and a long hollow plastic bat. Two teams of one to five players each attempt to advance imaginary runners to home plate, and score, based on where each batter places the ball on the field. The term Wiffle ball may refer to the sport as a whole, or the ball used in the sport. Wiffle is a registered trademark of Wiffle Ball, Inc. and was derived from the slang word whiff meaning to strikeout.

History 
Miniature versions of baseball have been played for decades, including stickball, improvised by children, using everything from rolled up socks to tennis balls. The ball most commonly used in the game was invented by David N. Mullany at his home in Fairfield, Connecticut in 1953 when he designed a ball that curved easily for his 12-year-old son. It was named when his son and his friends would refer to a strikeout as a "whiff". The Wiffle Ball is about the same size as a regulation baseball, but is hollow, lightweight, of resilient plastic, and no more than 1/8 inch (3 mm) thick. One half is perforated with eight  oblong holes; the other half is non-perforated. This construction allows pitchers to throw a tremendous variety of curveballs and risers.

In April 2011, the government of the State of New York proclaimed that wiffle ball, as well as kickball, freeze tag and dodgeball were a "significant risk of injury" for children, and declared that any summer camp program that included two or more of such activities would be subject to government regulation. The story became a frequent source of ridicule and amusement, with Parenting.com sarcastically commenting, "According to new legislation introduced in New York State, to survive classic schoolyard games like capture the flag is to cheat death." Wiffle ball executives originally thought the order was a joke. The company has never been sued over safety issues in its 50+ year history. The disapproval of people from across the nation pressured the New York legislature to remove wiffle ball and other entries such as archery and scuba diving from the list of high-risk activities, that require state government oversight.

Game

The game became popular nationwide by the 1960s, and is played in backyards, on city streets, and on beaches. The game is similar to baseball, and is designed for 2–10 players. A single game of wiffle ball consists of 7 innings or 60 minutes, whichever is earlier. 

To play the game, get a wiffle ball and a bat.  If a bat is not available, a broomstick or other such stick may be used. Marking a playing field is not necessary, but if a field is marked, it is shaped like an isosceles triangle.  The batter stands at the top of the triangle looking down the two equal sides that are about 60 feet in length.  A ball hit about thirty feet counts as a "single" and a ball hit about 45 feet counts as a "double." When a ball is hit outside of the sides of the triangle, it counts as a foul ball.  The line across the bottom of the triangle is about twenty feet in length, and a ball hit across this line counts as a "home run."  Scoring of this game is similar to scoring in baseball as are the terms used, i.e., "single," "double," "foul ball" and "home run."  However, there is no running around bases for the batter(s), and there is no chasing the ball for the pitcher and fielders.

Tournaments 
Tournaments have been the driving force in modern wiffle ball and have been held in the United States and Europe since 1977. That year, Rick Ferroli began holding tournaments in his backyard tribute to Fenway Park in Hanover, Massachusetts. In 1980, the World Wiffle Ball Championship was established in Mishawaka, Indiana by Jim Bottorff and Larry Grau. With the explosion of the Internet in the 1990s, there are now hundreds of Wiffle ball tournaments played in the United States, most in the same place every year, with a few tournament "circuits". The World Wiffle Ball Championship remains the oldest tournament in the nation, having moved to the Chicago suburbs in 2013, after introducing regional stops over three decades in Baltimore; Los Angeles; Indianapolis; Eugene, Oregon; and Barcelona, Spain. The tournament is featured at #27 in the book, "101 Baseball Places to Visit Before You Strike Out."

There is a national fast pitch tournament every summer held in Morenci, Michigan as well. This tournament determines which league is the best in the country. It is called the NWLA Tournament.

The first United Wiffle National Championship Tournament was held at WellSpan Park in York, Pennsylvania in 2020.

Leagues
There are many competitive wiffle ball leagues in the United States, which include the prominent American Wiffle Association (AWA) or Major League Wiffle Ball (MLW), although they are unrelated. Another one was a small wiffleball league started in June 2000 by Shaun Breen in the town of Cohoes, New York. The league operated until June 2004 and in its three years of operation it attracted players from Long Island, New York and garnered the attention of ESPN Magazine.

The most viewed professional Wiffle Ball league as of 2022, is AWA Wiffle Ball, established by Jack Blahous in Edmonds, Washington in 2020. The league consists of six teams: Northern Nighthawks, Southern Stingers, Eastern Enforcers, Western Wolf Pack, Central Cyclones, and Pacific Pilots. The league broke onto the scene in August of 2022 by becoming the first Wiffle Ball league to play on ESPN. As well as being featured on ESPN's First Take . 

MLW was established by Kyle Schultz in Brighton, Michigan in 2009. As of 2022, the league has eight teams: Eastern Eagles,  Midwest Mallards, Great Lakes Gators, Downtown Diamondbacks,  Western Wildcats,  Pacific Predators,  Metro Magic, and the Coastal Cobras. MLW has a strong following on social media, uploads highlights of all of their games to YouTube, and has also hosted open public tournaments in 8 different states (Michigan, Ohio, Arizona, Texas, Illinois, New York, Massachusetts, and Pennsylvania). The league gained notoriety throughout its 2020 season, after several other professional sports were postponed or cancelled. The league has been featured by TBS, The Athletic, Whistle Sports, and twice been highlighted on ESPN's SportsCenter Top 10 Plays. The most recent champions are the Downtown Diamondbacks, managed by Jimmy Knorp. 

The name has also been associated with a small league in the southwestern Illinois city of Granite City, which has come to be a hub of the sport with the Lakeside Kings having won multiple world championships in the Wiffle Ball National Championship Series. The League's inaugural national championship was held in October 2001 in Granite City,
whose wiffle only stadium has long been known for its similarity to Fenway Park and Busch Stadium. The national championship was launched following a decade long increase in interest in the sport, among fans and players of all ages.

As of 2015, there was also a sixty player league in Havre de Grace, Maryland, which featured former NBA player Gary Neal.

In 2013, the Greater Cincinnati Wiffleball League was founded in Cincinnati, Ohio. The GCWL season runs from May through October. Averaging 10 teams and over 50 players each season, it is recognized as one of the premier wiffleball leagues in the United States.

Fields
Some wiffle ball players have built fields to resemble major league ballparks. Thomas P. Hannon, Jr. authored a book, Backyard Ball, on his experiences building a smaller version of Ebbets Field. Patrick M. O'Connor wrote a book, Little Fenway, about building his versions of Fenway Park and Wrigley Field. But not all wiffle ball fields have been modeled from major league ball parks. Some have created original fields, Strawberry Field in Encino, California being the most exquisite. Rick Messina spent over $700,000 constructing Strawberry Field, which features lights for night games, bleachers, and a press box. He also converted a neighboring house into a clubhouse/pub. 

Building fields can lead to controversy and legal issues. In 2008, The New York Times published an article about Greenwich, Connecticut teenagers who were forced by the city to tear down a wiffle ball field they had built because of neighbor complaints.

In popular culture
In 1965 a wiffle ball was initially used when developing the sport of pickleball, but it was eventually replaced with a more durable ball.

In his 2003 book The Complete Far Side, cartoonist Gary Larson reproduces a letter he received after including a "wiffle swatter" in his cartoon. The letter contains language from Wiffle Ball Incorporated's attorneys: "In the future, when you use the brand name WIFFLE, the entire brand should be capitalized, and it should only be used in reference to a product currently manufactured by The Wiffle Ball, Inc." In 2009, video game developer Skyworks Technologies released a game based on Wiffle ball, simply titled Wiffle Ball.

In science, it is frequently used by marine biologists as a size reference in photos to measure corals and other objects.

References

External links

American inventions
Baseball culture
Baseball genres
Ball and bat games
Games and sports introduced in 1954
Balls